An election was held on 9 April 2012 for the governorship and deputy-governorship of Aceh. Incumbent governor Irwandi Yusuf ran as an independent, while former exile and Free Aceh Movement (GAM) activist Zaini Abdullah competed for the governorship on behalf of the Aceh Party with Muzakir Manaf as running mate. The election was the second to take place in the devolved Aceh region since the post-earthquake/tsunami Helsinki agreement between the Indonesian government and the GAM. The previous gubernatorial election in Aceh had been held in December 2006.

Zaini Abdullah was sworn into office as governor of Aceh for the five-year period 2012-2017 in an official ceremony in the provincial capital of Aceh, Banda Aceh, on 25 June 2012. Arrangements for the ceremony were, however, marred by some violence when there was a personal assault on the former governor, Irwandi Yusuf, and a grenade attack earlier in the day at the house of a local GAM leader. Following investigation by police two men were arrested and sentenced to 12 and eight years imprisonment by judges at Central Jakarta District Court.

Candidates
 Tgk. H. Ahmad Tajuddin & Ir. H. Teuku Suriansyah
 Drh. Irwandi Yusuf & Dr. Ir. Muhyan Yunan
 Prof. Dr. H. Darni M Daud & Dr. Tgk. Ahmad Fauzi
 H. Muhammad Nazar & Ir. Nova Iriansyah
 Dr. H. Zaini Abdullah & Muzakir Manaf

Result
Final results were released on 17 April 2012:

References

Elections in Aceh
2012 Indonesian gubernatorial elections
April 2012 events in Asia